Love a Little Stronger is the third studio album by American country music band Diamond Rio. Released in 1994 on Arista Records, the album was certified platinum by the RIAA for sales of one million copies in the U.S. Four singles were released from the album: the title track, followed by "Night Is Fallin' in My Heart", "Bubba Hyde", and finally "Finish What We Started". Respectively, these songs reached #2, #9, #16 and #19 on the Billboard Hot Country Songs charts. A demo version of the song, recorded by 4 Runner in 1994, can be found on 4 Runner's 2003 album Getaway Car. Former 4 Runner vocalist Billy Crittenden co-wrote the song.

Track listing

Personnel 
Diamond Rio
 Marty Roe – acoustic guitar, lead vocals
 Dan Truman – keyboards
 Jimmy Olander – acoustic guitar, electric guitars, banjo
 Gene Johnson – mandolin, backing vocals
 Dana Williams – bass, backing vocals
 Brian Prout – drums

Production 
 Tim DuBois – producer
 Monty Powell – producer
 Mike Clute – associate producer, engineer, mixing
 Herb Tassin – assistant engineer
 Glenn Meadows – mastering
 Charles Wallace – production coordinator 
 Maude Gilman – art direction 
 S. Wade Hunt – design 
 Jim "Señor" McGuire – photography

Charts

Weekly charts

Year-end charts

Certifications

References

1994 albums
Arista Records albums
Diamond Rio albums